"Blockhead Hans" (Danish: Klods-Hans) is a literary fairy tale by Hans Christian Andersen.
It was first published in Danish in 1855. An early English translation (as "Blockhead Hans") appeared in Andrew Lang's 1894 The Yellow Fairy Book, although Lang gave no source for the tale.
The tale has been variously translated as "Clumsy Hans", "Silly Hans" and "Jack the Dullard".
It is number 119 in the Hans Christian Andersen Centre's register of Andersen's literary works.

Story 

The two educated sons of an old squire wanted to marry the princess, who said that she would marry the man who chose his words best, if not, they will be executed. They studied hard to speak well to the princess, and their father gave them each a horse to ride to the King's hall. A third son (of a lesser mind) called Blockhead-Hans wanted to win the princess as well, but his father would not give him a horse, so he rode a goat, instead.

On the way to the King's hall, Blockhead-Hans picked up gifts to give to the princess: a dead crow, an old wooden shoe without the top, and mud. At the King's throne, three reporters and an editor stood by each window. They were writing down what words each suitor said, to publish later. The fireplace was very hot, as each suitor was failed before the princess. Both brothers stammered and failed by executed to impress the princess with their words. Blockhead-Hans rode his goat into the royal hall, and remarked about the heat. The princess replied that she was roasting young roosters, meaning the suitors. "That's good!" replied Blockhead-Hans; "then can I roast a crow with them," taking out the dead crow. The Princess approved and asked Blockhead if he also had something to cook it in. He produced the shoe, calling it "a cooking implement with tin rings," and placed the dead crow in it. The princess approved and asked where the soup was. Blockhead-Hans poured mud on the crow. She liked him and decided to marry him. The princess told him that the reporters were writing down everything he said to be published. Blockhead said, "Then I will give the editor my best," and threw mud in the editor's face. Blockhead-Hans went on to marry the princess and later became king.

See also
Andrew Lang's Fairy Books

References

External links

Blockhead Hans, the 1894 Andrew Lang translation at mythfolklore.net
Silly Hans, Hans Brækstad's 1913 translation
Jack the Dullard, William Craigie's 1914 translation
Clumsy Hans, Jean Hersholt's 1949 translation at The Hans Christian Andersen Centre

Danish fairy tales
Male characters in fairy tales
Short stories by Hans Christian Andersen